Niklas Kaul (born 11 February 1998) is a German athlete competing in the combined events. He won the gold medal in the decathlon at the 2019 World Championships, becoming the youngest ever decathlon world champion. In addition, he won gold medals at the 2022 European Championships, 2016 World U20 Championships and 2017 European U20 Championships, and is the current world U20 record holder in the decathlon.

Before concentrating on athletics, he played handball.

International competitions

Personal bests 
Outdoor
100 metres – 11.16 (-0.2 m/s, Munich 2022)
400 metres – 47.87 (Munich 2022)
1500 metres – 4:10.04 (Munich 2022)
110 metres hurdles – 14.27 (+0.4 m/s, Eugene 2022)
High jump – 2.11 (Tokyo 2021)
Pole vault – 5.00 (Doha 2019)
Long jump – 7.36 (+0.4 m/s, Tokyo 2021)
Shot put – 15.19 (Gävle 2019)
Discus throw – 49.20 (Doha 2019)
Javelin throw – 79.05 (Doha 2019)
Decathlon – 8691 (Doha 2019)
Indoor
60 metres hurdles – 8.24 (Frankfurt 2019)
High jump – 1.90 (Dortmund 2019)
Pole vault – 5.00 (Frankfurt 2019)
Shot put – 13.23 (Ludwigshafen 2018)

References

External links

1998 births
Living people
German decathletes
Sportspeople from Mainz
USC Mainz athletes
World Athletics Championships winners
World Athletics Championships athletes for Germany
Athletes (track and field) at the 2020 Summer Olympics
Olympic athletes of Germany
European Athletics Championships winners